Joe King may refer to:

People

Joe King (actor) (1883–1951), American silent-film actor
Joe King (trade unionist) (1914–1989), British trade unionist
Joe King (American football) (born 1968), former NFL defensive back
Joe Hill (novelist) (born 1972), American author, born Joseph Hillström King
Joe King (guitarist) (born 1980), guitarist for the band The Fray
Joe King, real name of Joe Queer, guitarist and lead singer for the band The Queers
Joe King, narrator of Why Korea? and Movietone News
Joe King, Mister Leather Europe, 2016

Characters
Joe King (The Beano), a character in the UK comic The Beano
Joe King, hero of the video game Flight of the Amazon Queen

See also
Jo King, cricket scorer
Jo King (triathlete), triathlete
Joe the King, a 1999 American drama film
Joey King (born 1999), actress
Joseph King (disambiguation)
King (surname)